Sargon (Akkadian: Šar-ru-gi, later Šarru-kīn, meaning "the faithful king" or "the legitimate king") was the name of three kings in ancient Mesopotamia, sometimes adopted in modern times as both a given name and a surname.

Mesopotamian kings
 Sargon of Akkad ( 2334–2279 BC), founder of the Akkadian Empire
 Sargon I ( 1920–1881 BC), king of the Old Assyrian city-state
 Sargon II ( BC), king of the Neo-Assyrian Empire

Modern people

Given name
 Sargon Boulus (1944–2007), Assyrian-Iraqi poet
 Sargon Dadesho (born 1948), Assyrian nationalist
 Sargon Duran (born 1987), Assyrian Austrian football player
 Sargon Gabriel (born 1947), Assyrian folk music singer

Surname
 Brett Sargon (born 1991), New Zealand curler
 Cindy Sargon, Assyrian Australian TV chef
 Simon Sargon (born 1938), Assyrian American composer and professor

Nickname
 Carl Benjamin, British political commentator and YouTuber known as Sargon of Akkad

Characters
 Sargon the Sorcerer, a comic superhero character from DC Comics, first appeared in 1941
 Sargon, a disembodied alien leader in the 1968 Star Trek episode "Return to Tomorrow"
 Sargon, a character in Daniel Pinkwater's 1982 novel Slaves of Spiegel
 One of the Titans in the 2019 film  King of the Monsters

Other uses
 Dur-Sharrukin (meaning 'city of Sargon), Assyrian city of the Neo-Assyrian Empire (911-605 BC)
 Sargon (chess), a 1978 computer game series
 Sargon (beetle), a genus of beetles in the tribe tropiphorini
 Sargon Stele, Assyrian royal stele found on Cyprus in 1845
 Sargonid dynasty, Assyrian royal dynasty